Phrynobatrachus sandersoni (common name: Sanderson's hook frog) is a species of frog in the family Phrynobatrachidae. It is found in southwestern Cameroon and in Equatorial Guinea, including the island of Bioko. It is named for Ivan T. Sanderson, a British naturalist and explorer, and later on, author and television commentator.

Habitat
Phrynobatrachus sandersoni live in the vicinity of streams in forest. They are only found in secondary habitats at higher elevations. It is a common species but it probably suffers from the loss of forest habitats.

Description
Phrynobatrachus sandersoni are small frogs: adults measure  in snout–vent length. They have a distinct tympanum. Tips of fingers and toes are dilated into large T-shaped discs; the toes have moderate webbing. Breeding males exhibit nuptial pads, lateral vocal folds, femoral glands and enlarged pseudo-teeth in the lower jaw.

Reproduction
Eggs are laid on leaves close to water, but not above water. Female frog may guard its egg clutch usually consisting of 12–17 eggs. The tadpole falls to the ground and develops on land. It has "semi-direct development": the tadpole relies on its yolk and does not eat; it lacks a fully developed alimentary canal.

References

sandersoni
Frogs of Africa
Amphibians of Cameroon
Amphibians of Equatorial Guinea
Amphibians described in 1935
Taxa named by Hampton Wildman Parker
Taxonomy articles created by Polbot